Spartanburg County is a county located on the northwestern border of the U.S. state of South Carolina. As of the 2020 census, the population was 327,997, making it the fifth-most populous county in South Carolina. Its county seat is Spartanburg.

Spartanburg County is coterminous with the Spartanburg, SC Metropolitan Statistical Area, which is also included in the Greenville–Spartanburg–Anderson, SC Combined Statistical Area.

 is named after the county.

History 
The county was founded in 1785 and was named after the Spartan Rifles which was a local militia during the American Revolutionary War. The largest city and the county seat is Spartanburg which resides in Upstate South Carolina.

Geography

State and local protected areas/sites 
 Arcadia Mill No. 1
 Arcadia Mill No. 2
 Battle of Musgrove Mill State Historic Site (part)
 Blackstock Plantation (part)
 Converse Heights Historic District
 Croft State Park
 Daniel Morgan Monument
 Emily Dickinson
 Glendale Ridge Archaeological Site
 Hampton Heights Historic District
 Hatcher Garden and Woodland Preserve
 Historic Price House
 Lake Cooley Park
 Nesbitt Shoals Nature Park
 Peter’s Creek Heritage Preserve
 Seay House
 Tyger River Park

Major water bodies 
 Enoree River
 Lake Craig
 Lake William C. Bowan
 Pacolet River
 South Tyger River
 Tyger Lake
 Tyger River

Adjacent counties
 Rutherford County, North Carolina – north
 Cherokee County – east
 Union County – southeast
 Laurens County – south
 Greenville County – west
 Polk County, North Carolina – northwest

Major highways
 
 
 
 
 
 
  (Spartanburg 1)
  (Spartanburg 2)

Major infrastructure 
 Greenville–Spartanburg International Airport
 Inland Port Greer, major rail depot in the county.
 Spartanburg Downtown Airport
 Spartanburg Station

Demographics

2020 census

As of the 2020 United States census, there were 327,997 people, 121,256 households, and 83,432 families residing in the county.

2010 census
As of the 2010 United States Census, there were 284,307 people, 109,246 households, and 75,404 families residing in the county. The racial makeup of the county was 72.3% white, 20.6% black or African American, 2.0% Asian, 0.3% American Indian, 3.1% from other races, and 1.7% from two or more races. Those of Hispanic or Latino origin made up 5.9% of the population. In terms of ancestry, 13.6% were American, 10.5% were Irish, 9.6% were English, and 8.8% were German.

Of the 109,246 households, 34.3% had children under the age of 18 living with them, 48.9% were married couples living together, 15.1% had a female householder with no husband present, 31.0% were non-families, and 26.2% of all households were made up of individuals. The average household size was 2.53 and the average family size was 3.05. The median age was 38.0 years.

The median income for a household in the county was $42,680 and the median income for a family was $53,149. Males had a median income of $41,445 versus $31,602 for females. The per capita income for the county was $21,924. About 11.0% of families and 14.8% of the population were below the poverty line, including 20.5% of those under age 18 and 10.9% of those age 65 or over.

Government and politics

Spartanburg County has long been a Republican stronghold, having not voted for a Democratic presidential nominee since 1976. No Democrat has won 40% of the county’s vote since 1980.

Education

Primary and secondary schools
Spartanburg County is served by the Spartanburg County School System, which is divided into seven districts. Some of the districts share a vocational school, and also share the McCarthy Teszler School, a special education school.
 School District One includes Campobello-Gramling, Chapman High School, Holly Springs-Motlow Elementary, Inman Elementary, Inman Intermediate, Landrum High, Landrum Middle, Mabry Middle, New Prospect Elementary, and O.P. Earle Elementary. District One students can also attend Swofford Career Center
 School District Two includes Boiling Springs Elementary, Cooley Springs-Fingerville Elementary, Chesnee Elementary, Hendrix Elementary, Carlisle-Foster's Grove Elementary, Mayo Elementary, Oakland Elementary, Boiling Springs Intermediate, Boling Springs Junior High, Rainbow Lake Middle School, Chesnee Middle School, Boiling Springs High 9th grade, Boiling Springs High School, and Chesnee High School. District Two students can also attend Swofford Career Center.
 School District Three includes Cannons Elementary, Clifdale Elementary, Cowpens Elementary School, Pacolet Elementary School, Cowpens Middle School, Middle School of Pacolet, and Broome High School. District Three students can attend the Daniel Morgan Technology Center.
 School District Four has four schools: Woodruff Primary, Woodruff Elementary, Woodruff Middle and Woodruff High School. High school students also can attend R.D. Anderson Applied Technology Center to learn vocational skills.
 School District Five consists of Abner Creek Academy (formerly Abner Creek Elementary), Duncan Elementary, Lyman Elementary, Reidville Elementary, River Ridge Elementary, Wellford Academy of Science and Technology (formerly Wellford Elementary), Beech Springs Intermediate, Berry Shoals Intermediate, D. R. Hill Middle, Florence Chapel Middle, James F. Byrnes Freshman Academy, and James F. Byrnes High School. Vocational school students can attend R. D. Anderson Applied Technology Center.
 School District Six comprises Anderson Mill Elementary, Arcadia Elementary, Jesse S. Bobo Elementary, Fairforest Elementary, Lone Oak Elementary, Pauline-Glenn Springs Elementary, Roebuck Elementary, West View Elementary, Woodland Heights Elementary, Fairforest Middle, R. P. Dawkins Middle, L. E. Gable Middle, Dorman Freshman Campus, and Paul M. Dorman High School. District Six students can attend R. D. Anderson Applied Technology Center.
 School District Seven consists of Jesse Boyd Elementary, Chapman Elementary, Cleveland Elementary, Houston Elementary, Park Hills Elementary, Pine Street Elementary, Mary H. Wright Elementary, Edwin P. Todd School, George Washington Carver Middle, Joseph G. McCracken Middle, Whitlock Junior High, Spartanburg High School Freshman Academy, and Spartanburg High School. The Daniel Morgan Technology Center, ZL Madden Learning Center, The Myles W. Whitlock Flexible Learning Center, and The Early Learning Center at Park Hills also serve District Seven.

South Carolina School for the Deaf and the Blind is in an unincorporated area in the county, near Spartanburg.

Spartanburg Day School, a private school, is in an unincorporated area.

Colleges and universities
 Spartanburg Community College
 University of South Carolina Upstate in Valley Falls
 Spartanburg Methodist College in Saxon
 Converse University (Spartanburg)
 Wofford College (Spartanburg)
 Edward Via College of Osteopathic Medicine (Spartanburg)
 Sherman College of Chiropractic (Spartanburg)

Healthcare 
Spartanburg County's healthcare is mainly provided by Spartanburg Regional Healthcare System. Spartanburg Regional is a public, not-for-profit, integrated health care delivery system with several facilities in Spartanburg, including:
 Spartanburg Medical Center (SMC), a research and teaching hospital with two locations: Spartanburg Medical Center campus on East Wood Street and Spartanburg Medical Center — Mary Black Campus on Skylyn Drive. Together, these campuses share a history that stretches back to the 1920s. Spartanburg Medical Center includes a total of 747 beds, and services that include emergency, surgical, maternity, cancer, a Heart Center and inpatient rehabilitation.
 Pelham Medical Center, in Greer, S.C., provides emergency services, general surgery, a medical office building and numerous practices.
 Spartanburg Hospital for Restorative Care (SHRC), a 97-bed long-term, acute-care hospital with a 25-bed skilled nursing facility.
 Gibbs Cancer Center & Research Institute, providing an inpatient oncology unit and outpatient care, along with access to clinical trials and the latest cancer technology. With locations across Upstate S.C., including Spartanburg and Greer in Spartanburg County.
 Bearden-Josey Center for Breast Health, a state-of-the-art imaging center for digital mammography, ultrasound, stereotactic breast biopsy and bone densitometry.
 Medical Group of the Carolinas, a physician group with offices located throughout Spartanburg and Upstate S.C.
 Regional HealthPlus (RHP), a network of hospitals and physicians of every specialty
 Woodruff Manor, an 88-bed skilled nursing and rehabilitation facility in Woodruff, S.C.
 The Sports Medicine Institute, located at Upward Star Center, where doctors, athletic trainers  physical therapists serve professional and recreational athletes

Cancer care expansion 
In early 2018, Spartanburg Regional began construction on an expansion of its Gibbs Cancer Center & Research Institute at Pelham location. The 190,000-square-foot expansion is intended to provide cancer care for more patients along the border of Spartanburg and Greenville counties. It is anticipated that the construction will be completed in spring 2020.

Communities

Cities

 Chesnee (partly in Cherokee County)
 Greer (mostly in Greenville County)
 Inman
 Landrum
 Spartanburg (county seat and largest city)
 Wellford
 Woodruff

Towns

 Campobello
 Central Pacolet
 Cowpens
 Duncan
 Lyman
 Pacolet
 Reidville

Census-designated places

 Arcadia
 Arkwright
 Ben Avon
 Boiling Springs
 Camp Croft
 Clifton
 Converse
 Cross Anchor
 Drayton
 Enoree
 Fairforest
 Fingerville
 Glendale
 Glenn Springs
 Gramling
 Hilltop
 Inman Mills
 Mayo
 Pauline
 Roebuck
 Saxon
 Southern Shops
 Startex
 Valley Falls
 Whitney

Other unincorporated communities

 Campton
 Cashville
 Cherokee Springs
 Crescent
 Holly Springs
 Little Africa
 Little Chicago
 Moore
 New Prospect
 Pelham (also known as Sugar Tit)
 Stone Station
 Switzer
 Una
 White Stone

Notable people 
 Harold Cohen
 Ira Roe Foster
 Joe Bennett & the Sparkletones
 Marshall Tucker Band

See also
 List of counties in South Carolina
 National Register of Historic Places listings in Spartanburg County, South Carolina
 South Carolina State Parks
 Tryon County, North Carolina, former county which included modern-day parts of the county
 Spartanburg County Foundation
 Eastern Cherokee, Southern Iroquois, and United Tribes of South Carolina, state-recognized group that resides in the county

References

External links

 
 

 
1785 establishments in South Carolina
Populated places established in 1785
Counties of Appalachia
Upstate South Carolina